Ethel Katherine Crum (1886-1943) was an American botanist, noted for collecting and studying California flora, as well as serving as assistant curator of the University of California Herbarium.  She discovered and formally described at least 13 species and varieties of plants.

References 

1886 births
1943 deaths
American women scientists
American botanists
American curators
American women curators